The cleaved amplified polymorphic sequence (CAPS) method is a technique in molecular biology for the analysis of genetic markers. It is an extension to the restriction fragment length polymorphism (RFLP) method, using polymerase chain reaction (PCR) to more quickly analyse the results.

Like RFLP, CAPS works on the principle that genetic differences between individuals can create or abolish restriction endonuclease restriction sites, and that these differences can be detected in the resulting DNA fragment length after digestion. 

In the CAPS method, PCR amplification is directed across the altered restriction site, and the products digested with the restriction enzyme. When fractionated by agarose or polyacrylamide gel electrophoresis, the digested PCR products will give readily distinguishable patterns of bands. Alternatively, the amplified segment can be analyzed by allele-specific oligonucleotide (ASO) probes, a process that can often be done by a simple dot blot.

See also
 RFLP

References

External links
 https://www.ncbi.nlm.nih.gov/projects/genome/probe/doc/TechCAPS.shtml

DNA profiling techniques
Molecular biology